Olën Park, also known as Profert Olën Park for sponsorship reasons, is a stadium in Potchefstroom, South Africa.

It was used for rugby union matches by the Leopards team in the First Division of the Currie Cup as well as the Vodacom Cup.  Quite often the annual inter-varsity between the North-West University and the University of the Free State is also played here.

Profert Olën Park was named after Carl Ludwig Theodor Olën who was the President of the Western Transvaal Rugby Union during the period 1922 to 1934. The stadium can host approximately 22,000 spectators.

In recent times a local fertilizer company situated in Potchefstroom, Profert has been contributing not only financially but also with their products and expertise, towards the upkeep of the playing field and as thus obtained the naming rights of the stadium.

The following games of note have been played at Profert Olën Park:
The British Lions of Sam Walker in 1938, the All Blacks of Fred Allen in 1949, the British Barbarians in 1958, the All Blacks of Brian Lachore in 1970, the French team of 1971, the British Lions of Willie-John McBride in 1974, the New Zealand Cavaliers of Andy Dalton in 1986 and Australia in 1992(on that day captained by P Slattery).

As from 2012 Profert Olën Park will again be the stadium where all the home fixtures of the Leopards will be played because the sponsorship of the Royal Bafokeng Sports of the Leopards, has been terminated at the end of 2011.

In 2018, the  announced that financial constraints meant they could no longer afford the maintenance of the stadium and they would play their rugby elsewhere.

References

Rugby union stadiums in South Africa
Sports venues in North West (South African province)